Stationers Park is a 1.5-hectare park in the London Borough of Haringey. It lies in the area between Crouch End, Stroud Green, and Harringay. Although considered Crouch End it is actually in Stroud Green.

As of 2021, it is a winner of the Green Flag Award.

It is built on the site of the former The Stationers' Company's School.

The park has two ponds, a cafe, two tennis courts, a basketball court, table tennis and two playgrounds. It is used by numerous under 5 groups and a forest school.

The Friends of Stationers Park is chaired by Luke Jones.

At the bottom of the park is Weston Park Primary School and Hornsey Vale Community Centre.

It is now one of the 4 key centres of the Crouch End Festival, which organises an annual family festival there with over 30 events/activities, including a free open-air film night.

Nearby public transport within walking distance includes Finsbury Park station, Harringay railway station and the route of the W5 bus.

References

External links 
 Stationers Park page on Haringey Council website
 Stationers Park Community Facebook Group

Parks and open spaces in the London Borough of Haringey